Daniel Jerome Rice (born November 9, 1963) is a former American football running back who played for the Cincinnati Bengals in the National Football League (NFL). He played college football at University of Michigan.

References 

1963 births
Living people
American football running backs
Michigan Wolverines football players
Cincinnati Bengals players
Players of American football from Boston